Graham Robert Butcher (born 25 September 1981) is an English former first-class cricketer.

Butcher was born at Epsom and was educated at Archbishop Tenison's Church of England High School in Croydon, before going up to Oriel College, Oxford. While studying at Oxford, he played first-class cricket for Oxford University on two occasions against Cambridge University in The University Matches of 2001 and 2003. He also made a single first-class appearance for Oxford UCCE against Middlesex at Oxford in 2003.

Notes and references

External links

1981 births
Living people
People from Epsom
People educated at Archbishop Tenison's Church of England High School, Croydon
Alumni of Oriel College, Oxford
English cricketers
Oxford University cricketers
Oxford MCCU cricketers